This List of hospitals in Wisconsin (U.S. state) shows hospitals listed by city in Wisconsin with links to articles.

Hospitals
As of June 2020, there were 159 hospitals in Wisconsin.

Health care organizations serving Wisconsin
 AdventHealth is a faith-based, non-profit health care system headquartered in Altamonte Springs, Florida, that operates facilities within nine states across the United States. The Adventist Health System was rebranded AdventHealth on January 2, 2019. It is the largest not-for-profit Protestant health care provider and one of the largest non-profit health systems in the nation. It has 45 hospital campuses, more than 8,200 licensed beds in nine states, and serves more than five million patients annually.
 Ascension is one of the largest private healthcare systems in the United States, ranking second in the United States by number of hospitals as of 2019. It was founded as a nonprofit Catholic system.
Wheaton Franciscan Healthcare, subsidiary
 Aspirus is a non-profit, community-directed health system based in Wausau, Wisconsin.
 Aurora Health Care is a not-for-profit health care system headquartered in Milwaukee and serving eastern Wisconsin.
 Bellin Health is a health care service headquartered in Green Bay, Wisconsin. Bellin Health serves northeastern Wisconsin and the Upper Peninsula of Michigan.
 Hospital Sisters Health System or HSHS is a non-profit healthcare system headquartered in Springfield, Illinois.  HSHS operates a network of 15 hospitals and other healthcare facilities throughout the midwestern U.S. states of Illinois, and Wisconsin.
 Mayo Clinic Health System is network of community-based medical services and partially owned and operated by the Mayo Clinic in Rochester, Minnesota
 SSM Health is a Catholic, not-for-profit United States health care system with 11,000 providers and nearly 39,000 employees in four states, including Wisconsin, Oklahoma, Illinois, and Missouri. 
 ThedaCare Health Care System
 Veterans Health Administration is the component of the United States Department of Veterans Affairs (VA) led by the Under Secretary of Veterans Affairs for Health that implements the healthcare program of the VA through the administration and operation of numerous VA Medical Centers (VAMC), Outpatient Clinics (OPC), Community Based Outpatient Clinics (CBOC), and VA Community Living Centers (VA Nursing Home) Programs.

References

Wisconsin
 
Hospitals